Professor Yongyudh Vajaradul (18 August 1940, Chiang Mai, Thailand) is a pioneer in the field of tissue banking and the use of bone allografts in orthopedic surgery, and serves as chairman of the World Buddhist Scout Brotherhood.

Yongyudh established the Bangkok Biomaterial Center at Siriraj Hospital in 1984, and Thailand became the tissue banking leader of the region.

The Pan-Asiatic Tissue Banking Association was first proposed in 1985 during the Western Pacific Orthopaedic Association Congress in Bangkok, Thailand by Yongyudh, Alain Patel of France, and Norberto Agcaoili of the Philippines, with its Secretariat at Bangkok Biomaterial Center. In October 1988, during the Third International Conference on Locomotor Tissue Bank in Bangkok, the new association was born and renamed Asia-Pacific Association of Surgical Tissue Banking (APASTB). The founding members included Yongyudh, who became its first president in 1988.

Yongyudh is a member of the National Scout Executive Board and the National Scout Council of the National Scout Organization of Thailand, as well as a member of the Asia Pacific Regional Scout Committee. Yongyudh was the Charter President of the Rotary Club of Bangkok-Banglamphu District 3350, Rotary International, in 1998. Yongyudh is a chairman of Interdisciplinary network of the Royal Institute of Thailand.

Awards
 1978 -Fellow of the Royal Institute of Thailand
 1987 -  Boy Scout Citation Medal of Vajira (First Class)
 1989 -  Officier dans l’Ordre des Palmes Académiques (France)
 1989 -  Knight Grand Cross (First Class) of the Most Noble Order of the Crown of Thailand
 1991 -  Chevalier de l’Ordre national du Mérite (France)
 1991 -  Knight and Dame Grand Cross (First Class) of the Most Exalted Order of the White Elephant
 1992 -  Member of the Order of Symbolic Propitiousness Ramkeerati Boy Scout Citation Medal (Special Class)
 1995 -  Freemen Safeguarding Medal (Second Class, Second Category)
 1996 -  Knight Grand Cordon (Special Class) of the Most Noble Order of the Crown of Thailand
 1999 -  Yongyudh was appointed an Officier d l'Ordre national du Mérite by Ambassador Coster, Embassy of France to Thailand on 24 June 1999.
 1999 - Boy Scout Citation Medal of Vajira (Third Class)
 1999 - Order of the Silver Elephant (First Class) - (All India Boy Scouts)
 1999 - Yongyudh was awarded an honorary membership of the European Association of Tissue Banks (EATB) at the Second World Congress and Eighth EATB Annual Meeting, October 7–10, 1999, in Warsaw, Poland.
 1999-Order of the Silver Tiger (first Class) Bangladesh
 2008 - He was awarded the Bronze Wolf Award by the World Scout Committee during the 38th World Scout Conference held in 2008 on Jeju Island, Korea.

References

https://web.archive.org/web/20050220074238/http://161.246.11.90/tatb/ls-8.htm
https://web.archive.org/web/20080311022537/http://sunsite.nus.edu.sg/nuhtb/apastb.htm
http://www.ingentaconnect.com/content/klu/catb/2000/00000001/00000001/00244060

Yongyudh Vajaradul
Yongyudh Vajaradul
Yongyudh Vajaradul
Yongyudh Vajaradul
Recipients of the Bronze Wolf Award
Officers of the Ordre national du Mérite
Officiers of the Ordre des Palmes Académiques
1940 births
Living people